Hiatomyia cyanea, the mountain deltawing, is a rare species of syrphid fly observed in the northwestern United States .Hoverflies can remain nearly motionless in flight. The adults are also known as flower flies for they are commonly found on flowers from which they get both energy-giving nectar and protein-rich pollen. The larvae are unknown.

References

Diptera of North America
Hoverflies of North America
Eristalinae
Taxa named by Raymond Corbett Shannon